Yur Mahalleh may refer to:
 Yur Mahalleh, Babol
 Yur Mahalleh, Sari